Rob LaZebnik (born May 6, 1962) is an American television writer.

He graduated from David H. Hickman High School in Columbia, Missouri and Harvard University. He currently works as a co-executive producer on The Simpsons and is credited with having written 20 episodes: "Treehouse of Horror XI" (the "G-G-G-Ghost D-D-D-Dad" segment), "Homer vs. Dignity", "Father Knows Worst", "Boy Meets Curl", "The Blue and the Gray", "The Daughter Also Rises", "The Changing of the Guardian", "The War of Art", "The Kids Are All Fight", "Friend with Benefit", "The Girl Code", "The Burns Cage", "Pork and Burns", "Throw Grampa from the Dane", "Baby You Can't Drive My Car", "101 Mitigations", "E My Sports", "Frinkcoin", "Manger Things", "Burger Kings" and "Portrait of a Lackey on Fire".

He co-created the Macromedia Flash cartoon series Starship Regulars on Icebox.com, and it was picked up by television network Showtime but never aired. He then co-created the series Greetings from Tucson, which aired for one season on The WB. LaZebnik has also been credited with writing episodes of Monk, The War at Home, Less Than Perfect, The Ellen Show and Empty Nest.

His wife, Claire LaZebnik, is an author and is the sister of television writer Nell Scovell. His son, Johnny LaZebnik, is also a comedy writer who has worked on The Simpsons. His brothers are Ken LaZebnik and Philip LaZebnik.

References

External links

Living people
1962 births
American television writers
American male television writers
Harvard University alumni
Hickman High School alumni
Writers from Columbia, Missouri